Cham (also known as Cham-e Zeydūn, Cham Zeydūn, Zaidān, and Zeydān) is a village in Sardasht Rural District, Zeydun District, Behbahan County, Khuzestan Province, Iran. At the 2006 census, its population was 404, in 89 families.

References 

Populated places in Behbahan County